The International School of Aberdeen (ISA) is a school in Pitfodels, Cults, Aberdeen, Scotland. It takes in students that come from other countries besides the UK, although British students are allowed to attend the school. It was formerly known as the American School in Aberdeen.

It is one of four IB World Schools in Scotland that offers the IB Diploma Programme. The other three are St Leonards School, St Andrews, Fettes College, Edinburgh and George Watson’s College, Edinburgh.

History 
In 2010, the school moved from its original campus to allow it to be demolished for construction of the Aberdeen Western Peripheral Route. The move was funded by the Scottish Government.

Facilities 

The International School of Aberdeen offers a wide variety of facilities such as multiple bathrooms scattered across the school, a theatre, 2 gymnasiums and a cafeteria which serves food 5 days a week.

See also 

 Americans in the United Kingdom

References

External links
 International School in Aberdeen
 International School of Aberdeen's page on Scottish Schools Online

Schools in Aberdeen
International schools in the United Kingdom
International Baccalaureate schools in Scotland
Educational institutions established in 1972
1972 establishments in Scotland